Grayling Charter Township is a charter township of Crawford County in the U.S. state of Michigan. The population was 5,827 as of the 2010 census, down from 6,516 at the 2000 census.  The city of Grayling is surrounded by Grayling Charter Township, but both are administered autonomously.

Communities
Bucks was settled by the Holloway Bucks family in 1870. Originally called Buck's Hill, it became a stop along the Michigan Central Railroad in 1889. It was then known as Buck's Crossing and served as a residents and stopover for the railroad builders. The name was later shorterned to Bucks. The community contains no more structures or residents, and it is now part of Camp Grayling.
Rasmus Hanson founded the community in 1914 along the shores of Lake Margrethe, which he named after his wife Margrethe. It became a stop along the Michigan Central Railroad as part of Camp Hanson, which later became Camp Grayling. 

History
The township was named for the grayling fish that lived in the Au Sable River.

Geography
Grayling Township is the second-largest charter township by land area in the state of Michigan (after Ironwood Township) and also the largest municipality by land area in the Lower Peninsula.

Grayling Township occupies a large area in the center of Crawford County and extends west to the border with Kalkaska County. The city of Grayling is located southwest of the township center, along Interstate 75, which serves the township with five exits. Camp Grayling, the main training facility for the Michigan National Guard, occupies all of the township west of the city of Grayling.

The Au Sable River flows west to east across the center of the township, joined by its East Branch from the north, while Lake Margrethe is in the western part of the township within Camp Grayling.  Hartwick Pines State Park is also located within Grayling Township.

Major highways

 (named locally as Hartwick Pines Road)

Demographics
As of the census of 2000, there were 6,516 people, 2,420 households, and 1,802 families residing in the township. There were 3,945 housing units at an average density of 23.1 per square mile (8.9/km2). The racial makeup of the township was 94.83% White, 3.04% African American, 0.48% Native American, 0.26% Asian, 0.08% from other races, and 1.32% from two or more races. Hispanic or Latino of any race were 0.80% of the population.

There were 2,420 households, out of which 32.5% had children under the age of 18 living with them, 60.6% were married couples living together, 9.4% had a female householder with no husband present, and 25.5% were non-families. 20.7% of all households were made up of individuals, and 8.5% had someone living alone who was 65 years of age or older.  The average household size was 2.55 and the average family size was 2.91.

In the township the population was spread out, with 25.5% under the age of 18, 6.6% from 18 to 24, 28.8% from 25 to 44, 25.2% from 45 to 64, and 14.0% who were 65 years of age or older.  The median age was 39 years. For every 100 females, there were 111.8 males.  For every 100 females age 18 and over, there were 108.3 males.

The median income for a household in the township was $34,690, and the median income for a family was $37,963. Males had a median income of $30,973 versus $22,857 for females. The per capita income for the township was $17,355.  About 9.1% of families and 11.7% of the population were below the poverty line, including 16.4% of those under age 18 and 4.4% of those age 65 or over.

References

Sources

External links
Grayling Township official website
Grayling Regional Chamber of Commerce

Townships in Crawford County, Michigan
Charter townships in Michigan